Opheliida is an order of polychaetes belonging to the class Polychaeta.

Families:
 Opheliidae Malmgren, 1867
 Scalibregmatidae Malmgren, 1867

References

Polychaetes